Job Kjell Hovik (born 20 August 1937) is a former Norwegian pole vaulter. He represented SK Freidig.

He finished twelfth at the 1962 European Championships. He never competed at the Summer Olympics. He became Norwegian champion in the years 1959-1964.

His personal best jump was 4.70 metres, achieved in July 1964 at Trondheim stadion.

References

1937 births
Living people
Norwegian male pole vaulters
20th-century Norwegian people